Joseph Henry Lim Yeo (born September 7, 1983) is a Filipino professional basketball player for the Manila Stars of the Maharlika Pilipinas Basketball League (MPBL). He was drafted third overall by the Coca-Cola Tigers in 2006.

Amateur career

Yeo took his primary and secondary education at Xavier School and his collegiate education at De La Salle University.  He was a part of the Green Archers team that completed its quest for four-peat by defeating Ateneo in the 2001 UAAP Finals. From a UAAP rookie year in 2001 where he averaged of 3.4 points, 1.5 rebounds, 1.5 assists, and 9.5 minutes per game, he improved this to an average statline of 11.3 points, 3.3 rebounds, 2.4 assists, and 23.3 minutes in the 2004 season.

In the PBL, he led his team, Harbour Centre Batang Pier, to its first PBL crown alongside ex-Ateneo star LA Tenorio by winning the 2006 Unity Cup Finals against Toyota Otis.

Professional career

Yeo was drafted by the now-defunct Coca-Cola Tigers as third overall pick in 2006, just behind Kelly Williams and Arwind Santos. As a rookie, he played limited minutes as a reliever to Tiger's main-man John Arigo. Despite the limited playing time, he still managed to average 10 ppg, 4.6 rpg and 1.2 apg in 26 minutes per contest halfway into the elimination round of the 2006-07 PBA Philippine Cup. However, this did not stop critics from calling him a bust and attribute this to his lacking in size to play the two-spot.

In 2007, he was traded, along with a future draft pick, to Sta. Lucia for former FEU forwards Mark Isip and Cesar Catli.  As a Realtor, he effectively played
his off-the-bench role, winding up as the team's second-best scorer behind Kelly Williams with a 13.5-point average, and became a vital cog of the team that won the 2007–08 PBA Philippine Cup.

In 2010, he was dealt to San Miguel for Bonbon Custodio.  While playing for the Beermen, he spent most of his time on the bench and in the injured list, and did not play with the team that won the 2011 PBA Governors Cup Championship.

During the midseason of 2013 PBA Governors Cup, he was shipped to Air21 Express in a one-on-one swap with Mark Isip. which reunited him with his college coach Franz Pumaren and college teammate Mark Cardona.  During the 2013–14 PBA Philippine Cup, he switched his role from shooting guard to point guard during the absence of Simon Atkins. He has since switched back to his natural two-guard position once Simon Atkins returned from injury and after the team acquired a true point guard in Jonas Villanueva.

In the 2014 season, he averaged 12.4 points, 4.1 rebounds and 4.3 assists in 31 minutes per game. His minute, rebound and assist marks were all career-highs while his scoring output was his highest since he averaged 13.5 points for now-defunct Sta. Lucia in 2008–09, his third year in the league.

Right before Air21 sold its franchise to NLEX, he was traded to Barangay Ginebra.

On May 4, 2015, Joseph Yeo traded by the Barangay Ginebra to the Barako Bull in exchange for fellow guard Sol Mercado.

On July 3, 2015, Joseph Yeo traded by the Barako Bull to the GlobalPort Batang Pier in exchange for 2016 1st round pick.

PBA career statistics

Season-by-season averages

|-
| align="left" | 
| align="left" | Coca-Cola
| 32 || 16.4 || .289 || .208 || .575 || 2.5 || .9 || .7 || .1 || 7.4
|-
| align="left" | 
| align="left" | Sta. Lucia
| 52 || 22.3 || .373 || .375 || .703 || 3.0 || 2.5 || .5 || .1 || 10.5
|-
| align="left" | 
| align="left" | Sta. Lucia
| 44 || 26.6 || .392 || .287 || .742 || 3.6 || 2.2 || .9 || .2 || 13.5
|-
| align="left" | 
| align="left" | Sta. Lucia / San Miguel
| 50 || 20.6 || .351 || .305 || .688 || 2.4 || 2.2 || .4 || .1 || 8.6
|-
| align="left" | 
| align="left" | San Miguel / Petron
| 40 || 15.3 || .346 || .318 || .816 || 1.8 || 1.3 || .3 || .0 || 5.2
|-
| align="left" | 
| align="left" | Petron
| 46 || 26.0 || .379 || .313 || .667 || 3.4 || 2.9 || .4 || .0 || 8.8
|-
| align="left" | 
| align="left" | Petron / Air21
| 30 || 20.7 || .387 || .333 || .487 || 2.2 || 2.2 || .3 || .0 || 6.4
|-
| align="left" | 
| align="left" | Air21
| 40 || 31.0 || .378 || .325 || .691 || 4.1 || 4.3 || .6 || .0 || 12.4
|-
| align="left" | 
| align="left" | Barangay Ginebra / Barako Bull
| 36 || 25.9 || .351 || .290 || .750 || 2.9 || 3.7 || .5 || .1 || 10.0
|-
| align="left" | 
| align="left" | GlobalPort
| 36 || 23.8 || .337 || .280 || .693 || 2.4 || 1.8 || .2 || .1 || 8.6
|-
| align="left" | 
| align="left" | Meralco
| 17 || 9.1 || .329 || .267 || .692 || .7 || .9 || .1 || .1 || 4.1
|-class=sortbottom
| align="center" colspan=2 | Career
| 423 || 22.5 || .361 || .306 || .693 || 2.8 || 2.4 || .5 || .1 || 9.1

Personal life

He married Angela Medalla on May 27, 2008, and their baby named Mariana Zaria M. Yeo was born on September 3, 2008, and in January 2012, another baby girl, named Helena, was born.

Feud with Enrico Villanueva

Yeo was notable for his on and off-court feud with college rival, former King Eagle Enrico Villanueva.  During the PBA-sanctioned Ateneo-La Salle Dream Games in December 2005, he elbowed Villanueva at the forehead as the latter was getting the ball rebounds. In 2006, another incident happened pitting the two rivals was after the game between his team Coca-Cola and Villanueva's Red Bull, when they engaged in a parking lot brawl.  They were both summoned by then PBA Commissioner Noli Eala.  He has since apologized to Villanueva.

When Villanueva was recently traded to Air21 in March 2014, he clarified that their old quarrel has long been a thing of the past.

Notes

References

1983 births
Living people
Air21 Express players
Barako Bull Energy players
Barangay Ginebra San Miguel players
Filipino people of Chinese descent
Filipino men's basketball players
NorthPort Batang Pier players
Meralco Bolts players
Powerade Tigers players
San Miguel Beermen players
Shooting guards
Basketball players from Manila
Sta. Lucia Realtors players
De La Salle Green Archers basketball players
Philippine Basketball Association All-Stars
Powerade Tigers draft picks